Lauri Soininen (1 April 1875 - 2 September 1919) was a Finnish journalist and poet. 

He was the son of Eerik Soininen and Brita Kaisa Similä. He made his debut in 1895 with the book Runopisareita. Soininen wrote several detective novels under the name Lauri Sauramo. He also wrote under the names Lauri Soini, L. Sininen, and Juho Ahava.

Bibliography
 1895 Runopisareita
 1896 Savon saloilta
 1896 Saaressa
 1897 Aaro
 1898 Kansanopistosta ja kansanopiston ympäristöltä
 1900 Kansallisia lauluja
 1902 Kansa ja kannel
 1903 Kuoleman kilpakosija
 1903 
 1903 Punasta ja Vihreää
 1904 Mikko Miheläinen
 1904 Taikapeli
 1905 Naisten ääni
 1905 Pianonvirittäjä
 1905 Salojen Elämää
 1908 Paratiisi ullakolla
 1909 Kirjavassa hameessa
 1909 Koti kulta
 1910 Isä Johannes
 1911 Luostarin metsästäjä
 1911 Pyhä hymy
 1912 Koitereen rannalla
 1912 Niskureita
 1912 Vanha Helsinki Vantaan suulla
 1912 Punakaartin päällikön tytär
 1913 Juhani ja Elina
 1913 Kalervo
 1916 Pyhäsaaren arvoitus

External links
 

1875 births
1919 deaths
People from Pielavesi
People from Kuopio Province (Grand Duchy of Finland)
Finnish writers
Writers from North Savo